Vasilis Ntziachristos is a Greek American biomedical engineer, scientist, and inventor best known for his development of fundamental and translational research tools for imaging tissues based on fluorescence and optoacoustics.

Biography 
Vasilis Ntziachristos is a Full Professor C4/W3 of Medicine and Electrical Engineering and holds the Chair of Biological Imaging at the Technical University of Munich. He is also the Director of the Institute of Biological and Medical Imaging at the Helmholtz Zentrum München and Director of Bioengineering at the Helmholtz Pioneer Campus. He is a founding member and board member of the translational oncology center TranslaTUM and has led developments leading to the foundation of the Munich School of Bioengineering, where he currently serves as the Speaker of the Study Program.

Ntziachristos studied electrical engineering at the Aristotle University of Thessaloniki, magnetic resonance as a Research Fellow at the Panum NMR Core Facility of the University of Copenhagen and at the Department of Radiology at Penn Medicine. He matriculated at the graduate program of the bioengineering department of the University of Pennsylvania where he completed a master's degree and a Ph.D. in bioengineering. His doctoral work, entitled "Concurrent magnetic resonance imaging and diffuse optical tomography to probe breast cancer", was carried out under the supervision of Britton Chance, Arjun Yodh and Mitchell Schnall.
Following graduation Ntziachristos joined the faculty ranks of Harvard University and Massachusetts General Hospital, initially as an instructor (2000) and then as an Assistant Professor (2002) and Director of the Laboratory of Bio-optics and Molecular Imaging. In 2007, he was recruited to Munich into a joint call from the Technical University of Munich and Helmholtz Zentrum München.

In 2013, he founded the open-access research journal Photoacoustics, which is the only peer-reviewed journal dedicated entirely to photoacoustic (optoacoustic) research. He currently serves as an editor of Chief of the journal. The journal is served by a Board of highly prominent researchers in the field.

For his work he has been awarded several prestigious awards, including the 2013 Gottfried Wilhelm Leibniz Prize from the German Research Foundation, considered to be the top scientific distinction in Germany and the 2015 Gold Medal of the World Molecular Imaging Society. For more information on his awards see the section on Prizes and Awards. His work often appears in the press.

The 2018 anniversary report of the Technical University of Munich features a chapter on Vasilis Ntziachristos, naming him as one of three examples of professors that shape the future of the Technical University of Munich.

Research 
Ntziachristos is a globally recognized pioneer and entrepreneur in biomedical imaging. One of his focus areas is developing technology for fluorescence-guided surgical procedures for improving the accuracy of tumor removal. He and his collaborators published the first translational study in which a targeted fluorescent agent was systemically injected to distinguish tumor cells from healthy tissue during surgery. This approach is now being validated in several clinical trials . In 2012 Ntziachristos was a founding member of SurgVision, a company that has since commercialized technology from this research.  SurgVision was recently acquired by Bracco Imaging S.p.A.

Recently, Ntziachristos and colleagues have demonstrated early detection of esophageal cancer, significantly improving detection over white light endoscopy. Successful application of this performance may mean life-saving curative procedures for tens of thousands of individuals each year and healthcare savings of several billion EUR per year.

Another focus of Ntziachristos' research is developing optoacoustic techniques for breaking thought the penetration barriers of conventional optical imaging methods. His group develops hardware, image reconstruction, spectral unmixing and information processing techniques as well as applications in biology and medicine. Among many other inventions, he is the inventor of multispectral optoacoustic tomography (MSOT) and raster scan optoacoustic mesoscopy (RSOM), which are non-invasive imaging methods that simultaneously measure different parameters of tissue physiology and pathology non-invasively, allowing new ways to diagnose disease and monitor treatment. MSOT and RSOM are now used in a range of preclinical and clinical studies, including advancing characterization of psoriasis, breast tumors, metastatic melanoma and inflammation in Crohn's disease. MSOT has also been used to visualize metabolism within brown fat, suggesting it may be effective for analyzing muscle energetics and lipid metabolism in a much simpler and more accessible way than with other techniques such as magnetic resonance imaging. Ntziachristos is a founder of iThera Medical GmbH, which currently commercializes optoacoustic technology and has placed systems around the world.

Prizes and awards (selection) 
2019: IEEE Elected Fellow
2019: Chaire d'excellence internationale Blaise Pascal awarded by the Région Île-de-France
 2015: ERC Advanced Investigator Award of the European Research Council
 2015: Gold Medal of the World Molecular Imaging Society
 2014: German Innovation Prize
 2013: Gottfried Wilhelm Leibniz Prize
 2011: Erwin Schrödinger Prize
 2010: GO-Bio-Award of the Federal Ministry of Education and Research (Germany)
 2008: ERC Advanced Investigator Award of the European Research Council
 2004: Named one of the 100 "top inventors" by the Massachusetts Institute of Technology (MIT) Technology Review

Publications (selection) 
Ntziachristos is author or co-author of more than 400 publications in peer reviewed journals and a holder of more than 25 patents. His work has been cited more than 45,000 times; his h-index is 108.

References

External links 
 Professor Vasilis Ntziachristos’ website at the Institute of Biological and Medical Imaging of the Helmholtz Zentrum München
 Website of the Center for Translational Cancer Research of the Technical University of Munich
 Website of the Chair of Biological Imaging at the Technical University of Munich

Aristotle University of Thessaloniki alumni
Academic staff of the Technical University of Munich
Greek expatriates in Germany
Living people
University of Pennsylvania alumni
Harvard University faculty
Massachusetts General Hospital faculty
Year of birth missing (living people)